Ancylosis calcariella is a species of snout moth in the genus Ancylosis. It was described by Ragonot and Hampson, in 1901, and is known from Tunisia and Spain.

The wingspan is about 28 mm.

References

Moths described in 1901
calcariella
Moths of Africa
Moths of Europe